Mount Bozgush, Bozqush or Bozqush Kuh is a  volcanic mountain  south of Sarab and north of Mianeh, East Azarbaijan Province, Iran that separates Iranian plateau from Caucasus. Tulips are cultivated on the rich volcanic soil of Mount Bozgush, and medicinal herbs such as pennyroyal, thyme, borage, nettle and liquorice grow wild on the mountain's slopes.  Mount Bozgush is a stratovolcano composed mostly of andesite.

Etymology
The name Bozgush in Azerbaijani language means grey bird.

Highest peak
Ağ Dağ with an elevation of 3306 m is the highest peak in Mount Bozgush.

Notes

Mountains of East Azarbaijan Province
Bozgush
Landforms of East Azerbaijan Province
Mountains of Iran